Hammonton may refer to:
 Hammonton, California
 Hammonton, New Jersey